A number of ships of the Royal Navy have been named Arundel, after the Sussex town, including -

 , a fifth rate
 , a sloop
 , an unrated cutter
 , a 
 , a 

Royal Navy ship names